Owen Edwards may refer to:

Owen Edwards (broadcaster) (1933–2010), Welsh broadcaster
Owen Edwards (figure skater) (born 1987), Welsh ice dancer
 Owen Morgan Edwards (1858–1920), Welsh historian, educationalist and writer
 Owen Dudley Edwards (born 1938), Irish editor and historian